Robert Rollo (1887 – 30 April 1917) was a Scottish professional footballer who played in the Scottish League for Hibernian as an outside right.

Personal life 
Rollo served as a private in the Royal Scots and the Royal Scots Fusiliers during the First World War and died of wounds in France on 30 April 1917. He was buried in Warlincourt Halte British Cemetery, Saulty.

Career statistics

References 

Scottish footballers
1917 deaths
British Army personnel of World War I
British military personnel killed in World War I
1887 births
Scottish Football League players
Hibernian F.C. players
Footballers from Glasgow
Royal Scots Fusiliers soldiers
Petershill F.C. players
Clydebank Juniors F.C. players
Scottish Junior Football Association players
Royal Scots soldiers
Association football outside forwards